"Stay the Ride Alive" is the thirty-seventh single released by Japanese musical artist Gackt on January 1, 2010. The song was originally titled "Stay the Decade Alive", before being renamed "Stay the Ride Alive" in late November.

Summary 
Like "Journey through the Decade" and "The Next Decade", Gackt recorded this song for the Kamen Rider Decade television series. It is used as the theme song for the Kamen Rider × Kamen Rider W & Decade: Movie War 2010 films.

In addition to the CD release, a version including a DVD of the music video was also released, as well as the "special memorial single" version which is a Digipak with a special cover, a third disc, and a booklet describing Gackt's collaboration with the Kamen Rider Decade production.

The music video for the single features Kamen Rider Decades Masahiro Inoue, who plays the title character of the series, and Kamen Rider Double.

CD

DVD

Special memorial single

Charts
Oricon

Billboard Japan

References

External links
Kamen Rider Decade on Avex Mode's official website

2010 singles
2010 songs
Gackt songs
Japanese television drama theme songs
Songs with lyrics by Shoko Fujibayashi
Japanese film songs